Adiós I'm a Ghost is the third studio album from American rock band The Moondoggies. It was released in August 2013 in Hardly Art.

Track listing

References

2013 albums